Charles Thomas Carpenter (December 9, 1858, in Bedford County, Tennessee – February 22, 1945, in Montgomery County, Kansas) was a pioneer banker who was taken hostage by the Dalton Gang in their last raid, October 5, 1892, in Coffeyville, Kansas.

Early life 
Carpenter was a son of Samuel and Sarah (Montgomery) Carpenter, of Palmetto, Tennessee.  He was schooled in a private institution at Palmetto, and attended the State University at Bloomington, Indiana, where he was a member of Phi Kappa Phi and graduated in 1876 with a Bachelor of Arts degree.

Career 
After graduation, he moved to Kansas to join his parents at Oswego, Kansas, where he first worked for his father, and then served two years as cashier of Condon Bank. In 1886, he moved to Coffeyville as a partner in the Condon Bank office established at Coffeyville that year.  He was also senior partner in the Charles T. Carpenter Insurance Agency, the largest agency in Montgomery County, Kansas. He served as president of the Coffeyville Board of Education and trustee of the Montgomery County High School at Independence, Kansas.

Family 
Carpenter married in 1892 at Rockport, Indiana, to Temple West, who was born in Pike County, Indiana.  She was a prominent woman of Southern Kansas in religious, social and public affairs, president of the Carnegie Library of Coffeyville, and the first woman honored with a place on the school board of that city.  She and her husband were the parents of seven children.

Dalton Gang robbery 
When the Dalton Gang attempted to rob two banks in Coffeyville on October 5, 1892, Charles T. Carpenter was taken hostage in his bank.  In the gun battle that followed the failed raid, which turned out to be the gang's last, four townspeople were killed, and four gang members were killed and the fifth captured and imprisoned.  Carpenter was not physically injured in the affray.

References

1858 births
1945 deaths
People from Bedford County, Tennessee
People from Coffeyville, Kansas
Dalton Gang
Crimes in Kansas
People from Oswego, Kansas
American bankers
Indiana University alumni